The College of Arts and Sciences at Illinois State University provides major and minor programs at the undergraduate level. Some of these programs are interdisciplinary. Many departments have teacher education programs where a student majors in a subject discipline while getting credentials towards a teaching certificate.

The College of Arts and Sciences is divided into three groups; Science and Mathematics (Biological Sciences, Chemistry, Geography & Geology, Mathematics, Physics), Social Studies (Communication Science and Disorders, Economics, History, Politics and Government, Psychology, Social Work, Sociology and Anthropology), and Humanities (Communication, English, Language, Literatures, and Culture, and Philosophy).

School of Biological Sciences
The School of Biological Sciences at Illinois State provides opportunities to study fields including genetics, neurobiology, evolution and ecology. Students, faculty and researchers work together in areas of Bioenergy, Bio math, Biotechnology, and Conservation Biology. The school's research programs include Behavior, Ecology, Evolution, and Systematics (BEES), Molecular and Cellular Biology (MCB) and Genetics and Microbiology. (GM)

Department of Chemistry
The department, in conjunction with the Department of Biological Sciences, also offers a Biochemistry‐Molecular Biology degree for students interested in careers in biochemistry, biotechnology, or medicine. Illinois State's Chemistry Teacher Education Program is accredited by the National Council for Accreditation of Teacher Education (NCATE), the Illinois State Board of Education (ISBE), and the National Science Teachers Association (NSTA).

The faculty maintains active, externally funded research programs that span traditional sub-disciplines of chemistry such as Analytical Chemistry, Biochemistry, Chemical Education, Inorganic Chemistry, and Physical Chemistry.

School of Communication
 The Daily Vidette provides ISU students with professional work experience and serves as the university community's daily newspaper.
 J-News provides majors in the School of Communication the opportunity for additional training and practical experience by producing a weekly online news site.
 TV-10 provides students with opportunities to practice television production and journalism techniques.
 WZND provides practical experience and training for all ISU students interested in the radio broadcasting industry.

The Department of Communication Sciences and Disorders offers comprehensive undergraduate programs. It has one of the largest SLP graduate programs in the country. The Department of Communication Sciences and Disorders graduate program is accredited by the Council on Academic Accreditation in Audiology and Speech-Language Pathology (CAA).

Current research interests include the areas of augmentative and alternative communication (AAC) and the attitudes of peers towards those who use AAC, fluency disorders, specifically in the characteristics of stuttered speech and treatment efficacy, language development/disorders and the scholarship of teaching and learning (SOTL), classroom acoustics and speech perception in noise, auditory perception in the hearing impaired such as psychoacoustics, speech perception in noise and amplification, phonological awareness and phonological processing skills in individuals with and without communication disorders, ways to provide hearing healthcare to undeserve populations, and development of school readiness skills in children with hearing loss. Research studies currently being conducted are examining phonological processing skills before and after enrollment in a Phonetics class, examining the phonological processing skills of children and adults who stutter, and examining how sound errors (obligatory, compensatory, development) of children with repaired cleft palate are reflected in their phonetic spellings.

The Eckelmann-Taylor Speech & Hearing Clinic is located on the second floor of Fairchild Hall/Rachel Cooper. More than 12,000 patients visit per year on average, making it one of the largest clinics of its kind in the Midwest. It is a state-wide resource for communication disorders in children with Down Syndrome.

Department of English
The faculty in the English Department publish research in Children's Literature, Rhetoric and Composition, Creative Writing, English Education and Pedagogy, Linguistics/TESOL, Literary and Cultural Studies, Publishing, and Technical Writing.

Department of Geography-Geology
The Department of Geography-Geology teaches and researches the area of geography by exploring spatial patterns of human-environment interaction as well as urban, political, and regional sub-disciplines of geography. Physical Geography and Geology teaching and research involve the scientific investigation of the nature of the Earth's interior, lithosphere, hydrosphere, biosphere, and atmosphere in four dimensions as well as forces that influence the development, distribution, and organization of physical features. Undergraduate majors are encouraged to participate in research with a faculty member, as either part of an independent study, a class assignment, or a funded project. All Geology faculty members are involved in undergraduate research because we believe that it significantly enhances the educational experience. Some of the fields that faculty and students are currently researching in are: Seismic Data Collection, Surficial Geological Mapping, Stable Isotope Analyses, and Geochemical Analysis of Basalts. In the graduate program, the students do their own original research. Areas of current research with the graduate program are Constructed Wetlands for Nitrogen and Phosphorus Removal, Using Noble Gases to Constrain Recharge to a Buried Valley Aquifer, Effects of Lateral Differences in Flow Velocity on Hyporheic Interchange, Fluid Pathway Delineation in Karst Aquifers, and 3D Geologic Mapping and Hydro-geologic Investigation of the Ticona Channel.

Illinois State University offers a six semester-hour course in traditional Field Geology that has been taught for more than three decades. The course is required for the Bachelor of Science degree, but applications from geology majors at other universities are welcomed.

History Department
Illinois State’s History Department has 30 faculty members and about 600 full-time undergraduate and graduate students, making this department one of the largest in the state. Over 100 undergraduate and graduate courses are offered through the History Department. ISU's History- Social Sciences Teacher Education program has been cited as one of the leaders in that field.

Languages, Literatures and Cultures
The Languages, Literatures and Cultures department at Illinois State is focused on the development of language proficiency (speaking, writing, listening, and reading), cultural and linguistic knowledge, and critical thinking through the analytic study of literature. Six languages are available for students to study.

Department of Mathematics
In December 2009, The Society of Actuaries named Illinois State University one of the Centers of Actuarial Excellence in North America for its Actuarial Science program.

Department of Physics
The Department of Physics at Illinois State ranks as one of the top two producers of Physics Bachelor of Science degrees in Illinois. The department is also in the top undergraduate only physics departments in the nation in terms of the number of physics majors. Undergraduate physics majors participate in faculty research programs, present at many conferences, and co-author publications in major scientific journals. Currently, Illinois State’s groups of researchers are exploring a wide variety of phenomena from basic quantum physics to applied materials science to space and astrophysics.

Established on September 1, 1964, ISU’s Planetarium offers both live and taped shows, and educational services including school and community group presentations, teacher workshops, adult education classes, and the Traveling Telescope Program. The presentations are available in six foreign languages, and effects such as clusters, binary stars and eclipses are also available. Located right on campus at the east end of Felmley Hall of Science, on the corner of College Avenue and School Street,  Click here to go to the Planetarium website.

The American Institute of Physics places Illinois State among the largest educators of physicists in the United States.

Department of Politics and Government
The Department of Politics and Government at Illinois State University has over four hundred students majoring in Politics and Government. Many are leaders in student government, and others participate in a host of different student organizations.

Department of Psychology
Within the Department of Psychology at Illinois State, the psychology courses are taught by full-time faculty members in their areas of study who all hold doctorate degrees, as well as conduct their own research. Students are encouraged to complete a professional practice placements in the community social-service agencies, schools, and businesses.

Currently faculty research had broad ranges throughout psychology.

More commonly known at the Psychological Services Center (PSC), the Stanley S. Marzolf Center for the Psychological Assessment and Treatment of Children and Adolescentsis dedicated to service, research, and the training of graduate students in the Clinical-Counseling Psychology Program and School Psychology. Graduate student clinicians are supervised by psychology faculty as they work closely with referred children, adolescents, and families. The PSC provides a wide range of services including individual and home-based or school-based assessment and treatment, group counseling, and classroom or parent education groups. The PSC also provides services to college students. It is located on the fourth floor of Fairchild Hall.

School of Social Work

The undergraduate and graduate programs within the School of Social Work adhere to the Educational Policy and Accreditation Standards (EPAS) as set by the Council on Social Work Education (CSWE), the national standard setting organization for social work programs.

References

Illinois State University